Dušan Poliačik (born 11 February 1955) is a retired Slovak light-heavyweight weightlifter who won bronze medals at all major competitions in 1979–1981, including the world and European championships and the 1980 Olympics.

References

1955 births
Living people
Olympic weightlifters of Czechoslovakia
Weightlifters at the 1980 Summer Olympics
Czechoslovak male weightlifters
Olympic bronze medalists for Czechoslovakia
Olympic medalists in weightlifting
Medalists at the 1980 Summer Olympics
Slovak male weightlifters
European Weightlifting Championships medalists
World Weightlifting Championships medalists